The Ahi Brotherhood (plur. Ahîler), referred to as Ahi Republic by modern historians, was a fraternity, guild and a beylik based in modern-day Ankara in the 13th and 14th century Anatolia.

Background 

Turkic people began settling in Anatolia in the second half of the 11th century. But they mainly preferred rural areas. Seljuk government on the other hand encouraged those who preferred a settled life in cities. After the Mongols began occupying Khorosan in the early 13th century, people from Khorosan took refuge in Anatolia and Seljuk government settled some of the newcomers in the cities. So a class of Muslim craftsmen and merchants appeared in the history of Anatolia.

Emergence of Ahis 

Ahi Evren, a Muslim preacher came to Anatolia before the Mongol invasions in Khorosan. He worked as a leather dealer in Kayseri and began organizing Muslim craftsmen in the cities. This organization was named after him. He moved to Konya and after Mongol invasions to Denizli and Kırşehir where he died.

Ahi as a political power 

After the Battle of Kösedağ in 1243, Seljuks were puppets of Ilkhanate Mongols and during the power vacuum in Anatolia, various tribes or local warlords established their principalities as vassals of Ilkhanids. Ahis in Ankara also saw their chance to declare their semi-independence under Mongol suzerainty towards the end of the century (about 1290).  However, Ahi Beylik, unlike the others, was not ruled by a dynasty. It was a religious and commercial fraternity which can be described as a republic not much different from the mercantile republics of the medieval Europe.

End of Ahi Beylik
In 1354, Ankara was briefly annexed by Orhan Bey of Ottoman Empire (then known as beylik). Although Ahis tried to restore their independence after Orhan’s death, in 1362 Murat I ended the political power of Ahis and they became the part of Ottoman Empire. In later years, some Ahi leaders even appeared as Ottoman bureaucrats.

See also
Akhiya

References 

Anatolian beyliks
Economy of the Ottoman Empire
Guilds in Turkey
History of Ankara
Society of the Ottoman Empire
States and territories established in the 1290s
1290s establishments in Asia
States and territories disestablished in 1362
1362 disestablishments in Asia